La Brea Avenue is a prominent north-south thoroughfare in the City of Los Angeles and in Los Angeles County, California.

La Brea is known for having diverse ethnic communities, and many shops and restaurants along its route.

History
La Brea is the Spanish phrase meaning "the tar." The La Brea Tar Pits, which the 1828 Mexican land grant Rancho La Brea was named for, are to the west of its intersection with Wilshire Boulevard in the Mid-Wilshire area.

In its early history, its northern section followed Arroyo La Brea, a former creek fed by springs in the Santa Monica Mountains that flowed south into Ballona Creek. Originally the southern section of La Brea Avenue within Inglewood was named Commercial Street.

Route
One end of La Brea Avenue is north of the Century Boulevard intersection in Inglewood, as a continuation of Hawthorne Boulevard in the 17-city South Bay area of Los Angeles County. It continues north through the View Park-Windsor Hills, Ladera Heights, and Baldwin Hills neighborhoods. It also passes through the eastern low Baldwin Hills mountain range, by Kenneth Hahn State Recreation Area and the remnant Inglewood Oil Field.

Further north, La Brea passes through Crenshaw and the West Adams neighborhood, and then through the Central Los Angeles area with the Mid-City West, Park La Brea, and Hancock Park neighborhoods. It is the dividing border of eastern West Hollywood and the city of Los Angeles.

The northern end of the avenue is just north of Franklin Avenue, at the foot of the Hollywood Hills in central Hollywood.

La Brea turns into Hawthorne Boulevard or California State Route 107  and terminates in the Palos Verdes Peninsula.

Transportation
Metro Local lines 40 and 212 operate on La Brea Avenue. Line 212 serves the majority of La Brea Avenue and Line 40 starts at Florence Avenue.

An elevated light rail station for the Metro E Line is located at the intersection with Exposition Boulevard in the West Adams neighborhood. Another light rail station for the Metro K Line at Downtown Inglewood is located nearby within Florence Avenue in the city of Inglewood.

An underground station for the Metro D Line at Wilshire Boulevard is currently under construction and is due to open in 2023.

Landmarks
 Ray Charles Station, West Adams Post Office — honoring Ray Charles, on La Brea at Washington Boulevard in the Crenshaw District.
La Brea near Wilshire is at the eastern end of Museum Row in the Miracle Mile district, which includes the Los Angeles County Museum of Art,  George C. Page Museum, Craft Contemporary, Petersen Automotive Museum, and Academy Museum of Motion Pictures (in 2017).
La Brea Avenue north of Wilshire Boulevard and south of Melrose Avenue has numerous designer boutiques, antiques and clothing stores, and cafés. The La Brea Bakery and the Lyric Theatre Los Angeles are on La Brea between Wilshire and 5th Street.
Pink's Hot Dogs — on North La Brea Avenue, Hollywood.
Charlie Chaplin Studios — built in 1918 on North La Brea Avenue, Hollywood. Later the A&M Records studios, and the present day Jim Henson Studios. A Los Angeles Historic-Cultural Monument.

References

External links

Streets in Los Angeles
Streets in Los Angeles County, California
Central Los Angeles
Crenshaw, Los Angeles
Baldwin Hills (mountain range)
Baldwin Hills, Los Angeles
Fairfax, Los Angeles
Streets in Hollywood, Los Angeles
Mid-City, Los Angeles
Mid-Wilshire, Los Angeles
West Adams, Los Angeles
Streets in West Hollywood, California
Westside (Los Angeles County)